This is a list of flag bearers who have represented Finland at the Olympics.

Flag bearers carry the national flag of their country at the opening ceremony of the Olympic Games.

 Russian officials told Finland that, because they were a part of Russia at the time, they were not allowed to fly their own flag.  They then refused to fly the Russian flag, but still joined the parade.

See also
 Finland at the Olympics

References

Finland at the Olympics
Finland
Olympic flag bearers